Grigorian or Grigoryan is an Armenian surname.  It is a patronym from the Armenian equivalent of Gregory, and is the Eastern Armenian form of Krikorian.

It can refer to the following people:
 Armen Grigoryan (b. 1960), Russian rock musician
 Asmik Grigorian (b. 1981), Lithuanian opera singer
 Artur Grigorian (b. 1967), Uzbek boxer
 Artur Grigoryan (b. 1985),  Armenian football player
 Artur Grigoryan (b. 1993),  Armenian football player
 David Grigoryan (b. 1982), Russian-Armenian former football player
 Gegham Grigoryan (1951-2016), Armenian opera singer
 Harut Grigorian (b. 1989), Armenian-Belgian kickboxer
 Hambarsoom Grigorian (1893-1975), Iranian-Armenian composer and music professor
 Karen Grigorian (1947-1989), Armenian chess player
 Karen H. Grigoryan (b. 1995), Armenian chess player
 Karen L. Grigorian (b. 1968), Armenian diplomat
 Marcos Grigorian (1925-2007), Iranian-Armenian artist
 Mark Grigorian (1900-1978), Armenian neoclassical architect. 
 Razmik Grigoryan (b. 1971), Armenian football player
 The Grigoryan Brothers, Slava and Leonard (b. 1976), Australian classical guitarists

See also
Krikorian (disambiguation)

References

Armenian-language surnames
Patronymic surnames
Surnames from given names
Surnames of Georgian origin